Zyra may refer to:

Zyra (singer), singer known for being featured in the songs "Say My Name" and "It's Only" by Odesza
A fictional planet from the 1951 film, When Worlds Collide
 Zyra, Rise of the thorns, a playable champion character in the multiplayer online battle arena video game League of Legends